Broxyquinoline is an antiprotozoal agent.An association with exercise intolerance has been reported.

References 

Quinolinols
Bromoarenes
Antiprotozoal agents